The men's 110 metres hurdles at the 1974 European Athletics Championships was held in Rome, Italy, at Stadio Olimpico on 6, 7, and 8 September 1974.

Medalists

Results

Final
8 September
Wind: 0.5 m/s

Semi-finals
7 September

Semi-final 1
Wind: 2.5 m/s

Semi-final 2
Wind: 2.4 m/s

Heats
6 September

Heat 1
Wind: 1 m/s

Heat 2
Wind: 2.5 m/s

Heat 3
Wind: -1.2 m/s

Participation
According to an unofficial count, 23 athletes from 13 countries participated in the event.

 (3)
 (3)
 (1)
 (1)
 (3)
 (1)
 (3)
 (1)
 (2)
 (2)
 (1)
 (1)
 (1)

References

110 metres hurdles
Sprint hurdles at the European Athletics Championships